Mariusz Fyrstenberg and Marcin Matkowski were the defending champions, but lost to David Marrero and Fernando Verdasco in the first round. 
Marin Draganja and Florin Mergea won the title, defeating Alexander Peya and Bruno Soares in the final, 6–4, 7–5.

Seeds

Draw

Draw

Qualifying

Seeds

Qualifiers
  Mikhail Kukushkin /  Philipp Marx

Lucky losers
  Facundo Bagnis /  Diego Sebastián Schwartzman

Qualifying draw

References
 Main Draw
 Qualifying Draw

International German Open - Doubles
2014 International German Open